Patsy is a 1917 American silent comedy drama film directed by John G. Adolfi and starring June Caprice, Harry Hilliard, and John Smiley.

Plot

Cast
 June Caprice as Patsy Prim 
 Harry Hilliard as Dick Hewitt 
 John Smiley as John Primnel 
 Edna Munsey as Helene Arnold 
 Ethyle Cooke as Alice Hewitt 
 Alma Muller as Patsy's Maid 
 Fred Hearn as Griggs 
 Jane Lee as Janie

References

Bibliography
 Solomon, Aubrey. The Fox Film Corporation, 1915-1935: A History and Filmography. McFarland, 2011.

External links

 
 
 
 

1917 films
1917 comedy-drama films
Films directed by John G. Adolfi
American silent feature films
American black-and-white films
Fox Film films
Films with screenplays by Joseph F. Poland
1910s English-language films
1910s American films
Silent American comedy-drama films